The list of ship launches in 1983 includes a chronological list of all ships launched in 1983.


References

Sources

1983
Ship launches